The 1882 Chicago White Stockings season was the 11th season of the Chicago White Stockings franchise, the 7th in the National League and the 5th at Lakefront Park. The White Stockings won the National League championship with a record of 55–29, 3 games ahead of the second place Providence Grays.

Regular season

Season standings

Record vs. opponents

Roster

Player stats

Batting

Starters by position
Note: Pos = Position; G = Games played; AB = At bats; H = Hits; Avg. = Batting average; HR = Home runs; RBI = Runs batted in

Other batters
Note: G = Games played; AB = At bats; H = Hits; Avg. = Batting average; HR = Home runs; RBI = Runs batted in

Pitching

Starting pitchers
Note: G = Games pitched; IP = Innings pitched; W = Wins; L = Losses; ERA = Earned run average; SO = Strikeouts

Relief pitchers
Note: G = Games pitched; W = Wins; L = Losses; SV = Saves; ERA = Earned run average; SO = Strikeouts

References
1882 Chicago White Stockings season at Baseball Reference

Chicago Cubs seasons
Chicago White Stockings season
National League champion seasons
Chicago Cubs